Giarmata (until 1925 Iarmata;) is a commune in Timiș County, Romania. It is composed of two villages, Cerneteaz and Giarmata (commune seat).

History 
Traces of a Neolithic settlement and materials of Daco-Roman origin were discovered on the territory of the commune. During the formation of the Romanian people, on the territory of the commune the native Daco-Roman population continued to live in the form of a village community, and at the beginning of feudalism there was even a fairly strong voivodeship, recorded in the few narrative sources of that time. Thus, on the occasion of the great Mongol invasion of 1241, the Giarmata Voivodeship is mentioned.

Giarmata is first mentioned in the registers of papal tithes from 1332–1337 with the names of Garmad and Carmad. With the names of Zamar and Garmat, the locality is mentioned in 1334, so that a year later it would be designated as Germad. Later, in 1428, the locality is recorded as Giarmath. The fact that in a relatively short period, of about 100 years, the name of the locality appears several times mentioned in the official documents of the time reveals that this settlement knew, at that time, a high level of development. The variation of the name under which the locality appears is due to the fact that the state authorities were interested in keeping the exact name of the localities, and those who made these records were often unfamiliar with these names.

The modern history of the locality begins with the conquest of Banat by the Austrians, in 1717. The census of the same year records two distinct villages: Veliki Đarmat/Велики Ђармат ("Great Iarmata") with 36 houses and Mali Đarmat/Мали Ђармат ("Little Iarmata") with 28 houses (both being inhabited by Romanians and Serbs). Under the new administration, Giarmata is colonized by Germans, who will form the majority of the population for almost two centuries. Already in 1720–1723 the first colonists settled here, which makes Giarmata one of the first German colonies in Banat. The Germans formed the village of Neujarmat ("New Iarmata") as opposed to the old settlement called Altjarmat ("Old Iarmata"). In 1754 the Germans built their Roman Catholic church, and in 1764 , an administrative officer of the Crown and Chamber domains, settled many German colonists here. The colonization lasted until around 1800 and made Giarmata a strong rural center of the Banat Swabians. Between 1769–1772, 327 families lived in Giarmata, entirely German settlers, the Romanian and Serbian population being deported in 1765 to Checea and Peterda (today Radojevo, Serbia). Starting with 1778, the Romanian inhabitants of Giarmata are mentioned again in the church registers. In the 19th century, the locals changed its name to Jahrmarkt, meaning "annual fair" in German, probably after it was granted fair rights in 1807.

Demographics 

Giarmata had a population of 6,502 inhabitants at the 2011 census, up 20% from the 2002 census. Most inhabitants are Romanians (88.63%), with a minority of Roma (1.65%). For 7.84% of the population, ethnicity is unknown. By religion, most inhabitants are Orthodox (80.27%), but there are also minorities of Pentecostals (6.31%) and Roman Catholics (2.6%). For 7.95% of the population, religious affiliation is unknown.

References 

Communes in Timiș County
Localities in Romanian Banat